Michel Lemarchand (born 13 April 1946) is a French bobsledder. He competed in the two man event at the 1976 Winter Olympics.

References

1946 births
Living people
French male bobsledders
Olympic bobsledders of France
Bobsledders at the 1976 Winter Olympics
Place of birth missing (living people)